The Medizinische Monatsschrift für Pharmazeuten is a monthly peer-reviewed medical journal covering pharmacology. It has been published since 1947, originally under the title Medizinische Monatsschrift: Zeitschrift für allgemeine Medizin und Therapie. Its title was changed to Medizinische Monatsschrift für Pharmazeuten in 1978.

Abstracting and indexing
The journal is abstracted and indexed in Chemical Abstracts, Index Medicus/MEDLINE/PubMed, and Scopus.

References

External links

Pharmacology journals
Publications established in 1947